Marilyn is a 1963 documentary film based on the life of the 1950s to early 1960's actress and sex symbol Marilyn Monroe. The film, directed by Harold Medford, was released by 20th Century Fox, and was narrated by Rock Hudson.

Background
Marilyn Monroe rose to fame with the 1953 film noir Niagara, released by 20th Century Fox. Monroe had signed with Fox originally in 1947, and played bit parts in a few films, starring actors like Betty Grable, June Haver, Cary Grant, Peggy Cummins, and Jeanne Crain. When released from Fox, Monroe found work as yet again a bit player in films like Love Happy (1949), starring The Marx Brothers. She re-signed with Fox in 1950 and began playing small but meaningful roles in big-budgeted films like All About Eve, starring Bette Davis. After several films, Fox gave Marilyn her biggest break with Niagara. The film starred Monroe, Joseph Cotten, and Jean Peters. Monroe went on to make millions for Fox, starring in movies like Gentlemen Prefer Blondes (1953), How to Marry a Millionaire (1953), and River of No Return (1954).

Monroe's first movie that did not meet expectations was There's No Business Like Show Business, a musical, co-starring Ethel Merman, Dan Dailey, Donald O'Connor, Mitzi Gaynor, and Johnnie Ray. This film's lavish production didn't overshadow the dragged plot line. However, Monroe re-gained her success with The Seven Year Itch in 1955, co-starring Tom Ewell and Evelyn Keyes. Seven Year Itch showcased the famous scene of Monroe's white dress being skyrocketed in the air by a subway grating. This film was a major success, as was Marilyn's next feature, Bus Stop (1956), which was her last film with Fox until 1960. However, Monroe's biggest success in a film was in 1959's Some Like It Hot, a comedy co-starring Tony Curtis and Jack Lemmon.

However, Marilyn only focuses on the films that Monroe made with 20th Century Fox, which excludes Some Like It Hot, as it was released by United Artists. Monroe's last film with Fox was the 1960 romantic-musical comedy Let's Make Love, also starring Yves Montand. In 1962, she signed on with Fox to remake a 1940 film called My Favorite Wife. The film was re-titled Something's Got to Give and cast Monroe in the lead alongside Dean Martin, Cyd Charisse, Wally Cox, and Phil Silvers. Monroe died before the film's completion. In 1963, Fox recast Something's Got to Give, with Doris Day, James Garner, and Polly Bergen, and re-titled the film to Move Over, Darling.

Releases
To date, Marilyn has not been released on either DVD or VHS.

References

External links
 

1963 films
Documentary films about actors
Films about Marilyn Monroe
American documentary films
1963 documentary films
Documentary films about women in film
20th Century Fox films
1960s English-language films
1960s American films
English-language documentary films